Lutherville Historic District is a national historic district at Lutherville, Baltimore County, Maryland, United States. It is an irregularly shaped urban entity founded in 1852 as a summer resort and suburb of Baltimore City. Single-family dwellings on large lots characterize the community and most of the structures predate World War I, although ranch-type and "colonial" houses have appeared in the past few decades.

It was added to the National Register of Historic Places in 1972.

References

External links
, including photo from 2000, at Maryland Historical Trust
Boundary Map of the Lutherville Historic District, Baltimore County, at Maryland Historical Trust

Historic districts in Baltimore County, Maryland
Gothic Revival architecture in Maryland
Victorian architecture in Maryland
Colonial Revival architecture in Maryland
Historic districts on the National Register of Historic Places in Maryland
Lutherville, Maryland
National Register of Historic Places in Baltimore County, Maryland